Sergey A. Pavlov (born 1958, USSR) is a Russian actor, clown, television director, writer and composer

Biography

1980 – Sergey Pavlov was a student of "Clown Studio" in Moscow Circus on Tsvetnoy Boulevard

1980–1984 learning in "National State College of Circus & Variety Arts" (Clown department)

1984–1987 working in "Moscow Stage Circus"

1987–2004 "Mosconcert" (Moscow Concert Company) with act "Music clown”

1994 TV Director Courses – He graduated from the "Moscow Institute Advanced Studies of Television & Radio" www.ipk.ru

The Clown Character LALALA and Show
On 1984 Sergey Pavlov has created a clown character LALALA (idea, designing ... by S. Pavlov)
Also he is an author, director of his clown/eccentric acts: “The Tangle”, “Little Violin”, “Conductor”, Dance “LALALA” (tap dancing), The Song "Quack-Quack", "Eccentric Slack Wire"...

Later S. Pavlov has created his LALALA SHOW. This is a physical comedy one-man show where he uses universal skills.

LALALA SHOW performed
1989 – Just for laughs – (International Festival) Montreal / Canada
1989 – OLYMPIC CULTURAL OF BARCELONA ' 92 (International Festival) Spain
1994 – THE 6th SPRING OF PUMPKINS (International Festival) Toulouse  / France
1994 – VI FESTIVAL INTERNATIONAL DE PALLASSOS * Cornella  / Spain
1994 – UN MUNT DE PALLASSOS (International Festival) Castello – Benicassim – Vinaros /  Spain
1999 – 6a MOSTRA INTERNACIONAL DE TEATRE DE PALLASSOS DE XIRIVELLA – Spain
2008 – HELEN STAIRS THEATRE (Florida) U.S.A.

Tours
 1989–1990 "SOVIET ACROBATIC REVUE" Big Tour – U.S.A./ Canada
 1991 – LES CLOWNS DU CIRQUE DU MOSCOU /Tour – France
 1992 – CARNIVAL PLAZA – Japan
 1998 – COMEDY SHOW – PANORAMA PARK THEATER – Germany
 2002 – New Year Events with "Fern Street Circus" San Diego – U.S.A.
 2007–2008 in the show with "CIRQUE LE MASQUE" – U.S.A.

also – Germany, Switzerland, Finland, Japan

Moscow New Drama Theatre
~1981 – THE MONOLOGUE ON CITY-PLACE – (Director: Svetlana Vragova) – Role: CLOWN

The Walt Disney Company
2000 – “C’est Magique” (Disney Cruise Line main stage Disney Magic) – lead role: Morty
2001–2002 “Pluto & Dog Catcher (Tokyo DisneySea) – role: Dog Catcher
2003–2006 Smear, Splat & Dip (Disney's Animal Kingdom) – role: Dip
2006 – Park Business Development (Epcot) – role: Voice Over

Filmography

As an actor 
 1983 – UNDER 16 AND OLDER – TV Studio SHABOLOVKA – Role: SERGEY PAVLOV
 1983 – O strannostyakh lyubvi- role: stunt man of lead character
 1984 – BUDILNIK – role: Clown
 1984 – Shutki v storonu – role: kitchen worker
1986 – RATTLING DOZEN – Musical (Studio Ekran)– role: tap dancer
1993 – Pierot and Harlequin – (student screen work) (IPK) – role: Harlekin
1994 – Only you (video) (old title – "Podlets" – (diploma screen work) – (IPK)
1995 – Chocolate (video) Spokoynoy nochi, malyshi! TV Studio OSTANKONO – role: Clown LALALA
1995 – Gift  (video) Spokoynoy nochi, malyshi! TV Studio OSTANKONO – role: Clown LALALA
1995 – SOMEBODY SLY... – (Russian Rock band "Chaif" – (Muz-TV) – role: Clown LALALA
2008 – LALALA SHOW (promo reel) (video) – role: Clown LALALA

As a film director 
1993 – Pierot and Harlequin – (student screen work) (IPK)
1994 – Only you (video) (old title – "Podlets" – (diploma screen work) – (IPK)
1995 – Chocolate (video) Spokoynoy nochi, malyshi! TV Studio OSTANKONO
1995 – Gift (video) Spokoynoy nochi, malyshi! TV Studio OSTANKONO
2008 – LALALA SHOW (promo reel) (video)

As a writer
1993 – Pierot and Harlequin – (student screen work) (IPK)
1994 – Only you (video) (old title – "Podlets" – (diploma screen work) – (IPK)
1995 – Chocolate (video) Spokoynoy nochi, malyshi! TV Studio OSTANKONO
1995 – Gift (video) Spokoynoy nochi, malyshi! TV Studio OSTANKONO
2008 – LALALA SHOW (promo reel) (video)

As a composer
1993 – Pierot and Harlequin – (student screen work) IPK(IPK)
1995 – Chocolate (video) Spokoynoy nochi, malyshi! TV Studio OSTANKONO
2008 – LALALA SHOW (promo reel) Music and Soundtrack (video)

Radio of Russia
On 1996 two songs sounded by Sergey Pavlov (guitar and vocal)
Funny Old Man – words: Daniil Kharms, music: S. Pavlov
Left Socks Thieves- words: Dr. Seuss (Russian translation by G. Kruzhkov), music: S. Pavlov

The Trick
On 1984 Sergey Pavlov has created the new unique trick - "Rope Skips on the Slack Wire" (video).

This is like a small revolution, new "word" in "Slack Wire" balancing.
No one has ever performed this trick before. Considered - that is not possible to do jump tricks with lift-off on the slack wire.

The trick is the highest complexity. Jumps are executing in succession in the temp.

Usually Sergey Pavlov performed in his show promptly 3, sometimes 4 rope skips on the slack wire.

 2009 – Five rope skips balancing on Slack Wire (video)

S. Pavlov's record is seven skips in the temp.

External links
LALALA-SHOW
LALALA SHOW ON FACEBOOK
Sergey Pavlov LALALA MUSIC
National Collerg Circus & Variety Arts – 1984(rus)
Soviet Clown Finds Laughter Spans the Globe (Los Angeles Times)

References

Russian male actors
Russian clowns
Living people
1958 births